The New Guinea friarbird (Philemon buceroides novaeguineae), also known as the Papuan friarbird, is a bird in the Meliphagidae, or honeyeater family.  Many taxonomists consider it to be a subspecies of the helmeted friarbird, although some consider it to be a distinct species.

Distribution and habitat
It is found in northern Australia and New Guinea. Its natural habitat is subtropical or tropical moist lowland forests.

References
 BirdLife International 2004.  Philemon novaeguineae.   2006 IUCN Red List of Threatened Species.   Downloaded on 26 July 2007.

New Guinea friarbird
Birds of New Guinea
New Guinea friarbird
Taxonomy articles created by Polbot